Dennis the Menace (released in the United Kingdom as Dennis to avoid confusion with an identically named comic strip character) is a 1993 American family comedy film based on the Hank Ketcham comic strip of the same name. It was directed by Nick Castle and written and coproduced by John Hughes, and distributed by Warner Bros. under their Family Entertainment label. It concerns the misadventures of a mischievous child (Mason Gamble) who wreaks havoc on his next door neighbor, George Wilson (Walter Matthau), usually hangs out with his friends, Joey McDonald (Kellen Hathaway) and Margaret Wade (Amy Sakasitz), and is followed everywhere by his dog, Ruff. It also features a cameo appearance by Jeannie Russell, who played Margaret on the original 1959 TV series.

Released on June 25, 1993, the film was a commercial success, grossing $117.2 million on a $35 million budget despite receiving negative reviews from critics. A direct-to-video sequel called Dennis the Menace Strikes Again was later released in 1998 without the cast from this film. A second one called A Dennis the Menace Christmas was released in 2007 with a different cast from both this film and the second one.

Plot
Five-year-old Dennis Mitchell is a constant source of mischief, especially to his retired next door neighbor, George Wilson. George pretends to be asleep to avoid Dennis, who mistakes this for illness and shoots an aspirin into his mouth with a slingshot. Dennis' parents, Henry and Alice, try to discipline him as they get ready for work, and leave him with his friend, Joey McDonald, at the home of their classmate, Margaret Wade, whom they dislike. As they fix up an abandoned treehouse in the woods, itinerant criminal Switchblade Sam arrives in town.

Vacuuming up spilt paint in the garage, Dennis inadvertently shoots a glob of it onto George’s barbecue grill; tasting it, he suspects Dennis. Henry and Alice leave Dennis with a teenage babysitter named Polly, who invites her boyfriend, Mickey, over. Sneaking outside, Dennis pranks them by ringing the doorbell and hiding until Mickey tapes a thumbtack to it. George investigates the vacuum in the Mitchells' garage and accidentally shoots himself in the gonads with a golf ball. Hoping to confront the Mitchells, he pricks his thumb on the tack; mistaking him for the prankster, Polly and Mickey douse him with water and flour. Switchblade Sam commits a string of robberies throughout town, and is noticed by Chief Bennett.

Bringing the sleeping George an apology card, Dennis plays with his dentures, loses the two front incisors, and replaces them with Chiclets just before he has his picture taken for the local newspaper. Henry and Alice both leave on business trips, but are unable to find anyone willing to babysit Dennis. George's wife, Martha, agrees to let him stay with them, happy to treat him as the child they never had. George is infuriated by slipping in Dennis' spilt bath water, and discovering Dennis has replaced his nasal spray with mouthwash and the latter with toilet cleanser. Dennis lets his dog, Ruff, in the Wilsons’ house, leading George to mistake him for Martha in the dark living room. In the attic, Dennis' carelessness causes George to slip on split mothballs and nearly get crushed by a canoe which contains the garden lanterns he's looking for.

George has been chosen to host his garden club's "Summer Floraganza", having spent almost forty years growing a rare orchid that will finally bloom that night. During the party, Dennis presses the garage door button (thinking it's a doorbell, repeating his earlier ding-dong ditch prank), and it opens and upends the entire dessert table, and is angrily sent to his bedroom. While the Wilsons and their guests await the flower’s nocturnal display, Switchblade Sam robs their house, stealing George’s antique coin collection. Dennis, who heard him and then discovers the empty safe, alerts George, distracting everyone from the flower's brief blooming, and it dies afterward. Furious and unaware that he has been robbed, George coldly chastises Dennis, who flees to the woods in sadness and is caught by Switchblade Sam. Henry and Alice arrive home to learn he has disappeared, prompting a town-wide search, and even a guilt-ridden George sets out to look for him after realizing that he was telling the truth about the robbery.

Switchblade Sam prepares to leave town with Dennis as an unsuspecting hostage. Showing him the proper way to tie him up, Dennis handcuffs him, loses the key, unintentionally bludgeons him, and sets him on fire. Just as Dennis discovers George’s stolen coins and realizes Switchblade Sam is a thief, the latter attempts to stab him but is snared in a rope caught by a passing train. The next morning, Dennis returns home with the captured Switchblade Sam and George's recovered coins, to the relief of George and the entire neighborhood. Switchblade Sam is arrested, and Dennis naïvely returns his knife and he attempts to stab him with it again, but Chief Bennett closes the police car door on his hand, causing him to drop the knife down a storm drain and wince in pain before being driven away.

Dennis and George make amends, and Alice mentions that she can bring Dennis to work with her as her office now has a day care center. George insists he would be happy to watch Dennis himself, just as Dennis accidentally flings a flaming marshmallow onto his forehead. During the closing credits, Dennis gets Alice's condescending coworker, Andrea, caught in the office copy machine.

Cast

 Mason Gamble as Dennis Mitchell
 Walter Matthau as George Wilson
 Joan Plowright as Martha Wilson
 Christopher Lloyd as Switchblade Sam
 Lea Thompson as Alice Mitchell
 Robert Stanton as Henry Mitchell
 Amy Sakasitz as Margaret Wade
 Kellen Hathaway as Joey McDonald
 Paul Winfield as Chief Bennett
 Natasha Lyonne as Polly
 Devin Ratray as Mickey
 Hank Johnston as Gunther Beckman
 Melinda Mullins as Andrea
 Billie Bird as Edith Butterwell
 Bill Erwin as Edward Little
 Arnold Stang as Photographer
 Ben Stein as Boss (only cameo shot at meeting)
 Jeannie Russell as Neighbor

Production
Mason Gamble won the role of Dennis Mitchell after beating out a reported 20,000 other children who had auditioned for it.

The film premiered on June 25, 1993. It was known simply as Dennis in the United Kingdom in order to avoid confusion with an unrelated British comic strip, also called "Dennis the Menace", which also debuted in 1951.

Music
The film's music was composed by veteran composer Jerry Goldsmith, who was John Hughes' first and only choice to write the score for it. The short-lived Big Screen Records label released an album of Goldsmith's score alongside the film in July 1993; La-La Land Records issued the complete score in April 2014 as part of their Expanded Archival Collection on Warner Bros. titles.

Additionally, three old-time pop hits were featured in the film: "Don't Hang Up" by The Orlons, "Whatcha Know Joe" by Jo Stafford (from the 1963 album, Getting Sentimental over Tommy Dorsey) and "A String of Pearls" by Glenn Miller.

Reception
The film was a success at the box office. Against a $35 million budget, it grossed $51.3 million domestically and a further $66 million overseas to a total of $117.3 million worldwide, despite generally mixed reviews from film critics.
In Germany, it grossed more than $5 million from 800,000 admissions in its first 10 days and was number one at the box office for three weeks. On Rotten Tomatoes, it has an approval rating of 27%, based on 26 reviews with an average rating of 3.9/10. The website's critical consensus reads, "Walter Matthau does a nice job as Mr. Wilson, but Dennis the Menace follows the Home Alone formula far too closely." On Metacritic, the film has a weighted average score of 49 out of 100, based on 25 critics, indicating "mixed or average reviews". Audiences polled by CinemaScore gave the film an average grade of "A-" on an A+ to F scale.

Vincent Canby, in what would become one of his final reviews for The New York Times, remarked that "this 'Dennis the Menace' isn't a comic strip, but then it's not really a movie, certainly not one in the same giddy league with the two 'Home Alone' movies," adding that "Mr. Hughes and Mr. Castle try hard to recreate a kind of timeless, idealized comic strip atmosphere, but except for the performances of Lea Thompson and Robert Stanton, who play Henry and Alice, nobody in the movie seems in touch with the nature of the comedy" and that the film "simply looks bland, unrooted in any reality." Of the other performances, Canby stated that Gamble was "a handsome boy, but [that] he displays none of the spontaneity that initially made [Macaulay] Culkin so refreshing".

A mixed review came from Peter Rainer of the Los Angeles Times, who praised Matthau's performance enormously, yet called the film "pretty tepid tomfoolery but [...] not assaultive in the way that most kids’ films are nowadays": 

Roger Ebert gave the film two-and-a-half stars out of four and wrote, "There's a lot to like in Dennis the Menace. But Switchblade Sam prevents me from recommending it." Mason Gamble received a Razzie Award nomination for Worst New Star but also won "Best Youth Actor Leading Role in a Motion Picture: Comedy" at the 15th Youth in Film Awards.

Video game
The film also spawned a platforming video game for the Amiga, Super NES, and Game Boy platforms. It included stages based on Mr. Wilsons' house, the great outdoors, and a boiler room among others.

References

External links

 
 
 
 
 

1993 films
1990s English-language films
1993 comedy films
1990s children's adventure films
1990s children's comedy films
American children's adventure films
American children's comedy films
American slapstick comedy films
Films about children
Films about pranks
Films based on American comics
Films based on comic strips
Films directed by Nick Castle
Films produced by John Hughes (filmmaker)
Films with screenplays by John Hughes (filmmaker)
Films scored by Jerry Goldsmith
Films shot in Chicago
Live-action films based on comics
Dennis the Menace (U.S. comics) films
Warner Bros. films
1990s American films